Dual specificity protein kinase CLK1 is an enzyme that in humans is encoded by the CLK1 gene.

Function 

This gene encodes a member of the CDC2-like (or LAMMER) family of dual specificity protein kinases. In the cell nucleus, the encoded protein phosphorylates serine/arginine-rich proteins involved in pre-mRNA processing, releasing them into the nucleoplasm. The choice of splice sites during pre-mRNA processing may be regulated by the concentration of transacting factors, including serine/arginine-rich proteins. Therefore, the encoded protein may play an indirect role in governing splice site selection.

Interactions 

CLK1 has been shown to interact with ASF/SF2.

References

External links

Further reading